Angela Black is a six-part thriller series, created and written by Harry Williams and Jack Williams, which began airing on ITV on 10 October 2021, in six weekly installments. The show is internationally co-produced by Spectrum Originals and ITV in conjunction with Two Brothers Pictures.

Premise
Angela Black (Froggatt), a wife and mother of two, is approached by a mysterious man  (Adewunmi) who reveals secrets about her abusive husband (Huisman).

Cast
 Joanne Froggatt as Angela Black  
 Michiel Huisman as Olivier Meyer
 Samuel Adewunmi as Ed

Episodes

Production
On 8 October 2020, ITV announced that Joanne Froggatt would be leading a new series co-starring Michiel Huisman. The series was written by Harry and Jack Williams, directed by Craig Viveiros and produced by Two Brothers Pictures. the Williams' production company. Filming began in London in October 2020.

Release
In Australia the series will air on streaming network Stan. In the US the series will air as a Spectrum Original. In Brazil, the series premiered in streaming via Globoplay.

References

External links
 

British thriller television series
2021 British television series debuts
2021 British television series endings
ITV (TV network) original programming
Television series by All3Media